Gradski stadion is a football stadium in Lovech, Bulgaria. It is currently used for football matches. The stadium has more than 8100 seats. On July 12, 2010, the venue received a 3-star rating by UEFA and currently meets the UEFA guidelines to host Champions League and Europa League matches. The record attendance of the stadium was achieved at the game between Levski Sofia and Litex Lovech in 1997, Bulgarian cup match, Litex win 2-0 - 12,500 spectators. Most visited in UEFA's match against Aston Villa in 2008-8000 spectators 
In 2010, right after the end of the 2009-10 season of the A PFG, the stadium was totally reconstructed to meet the UEFA rules for a 3-star UEFA stadium, in order to host the home matches of Litex Lovech in the 2010-11 UEFA Champions League. The reconstructions of the stadium started on May 12, 2010 and finished on July 10, at a total cost of €3 million.

Summer of 2011 renovations of the stadium continued as the main stand was demolished and a new one constructed.

References

External links
Official website of the football club 

Football venues in Bulgaria
PFC Litex Lovech
Buildings and structures in Lovech